Francis Schewetta (29 August 1919 – 8 October 2007) was a French track and field athlete, who mainly competed in the men's 400 metres during his career. He was born in Bréhat, Côtes-d'Armor.

He competed for France at the 1948 Summer Olympics held in London, Great Britain, where he won the silver medal in the men's 4 x 400 metre relay with his teammates Jean Kerebel, Robert Chef d’Hotel and Jacques Lunis.

Competition record

References

1919 births
2007 deaths
French male sprinters
Olympic silver medalists for France
Athletes (track and field) at the 1948 Summer Olympics
Olympic athletes of France
French people of Breton descent
Sportspeople from Côtes-d'Armor
Medalists at the 1948 Summer Olympics
Olympic silver medalists in athletics (track and field)
20th-century French people
21st-century French people